New York Se New Karachi is a Pakistani television series that aired on TVOne Pakistan. The script of the serial was written by Mohsin Ali and while it was directed by Fahim Burney. It stars Azfar Rehman as Salman, a typical Karachi boy while Ainy Jaffri as Sara, a modern girl returns to Pakistan along with her family.

At 14th Lux Style Awards, it received nomination of Best Television Actor to Azfar Rehman.

Plot 
The story starts with a couple, Feroza and Kifayat who lives in New York from many past years. To attend a family wedding, their family comes to New Karachi, in Kifayat's ancestral home. Feroza with a sense of superiority complex, tires of her Punjabi sister-in-law, Razia. The story takes a turns when it reveals that their children, Sara and Salman are interested in each other and want to marry.

Cast 
 Asfar Rehman as Salman
 Annie Jafri as Sara
 Qavi Khan as Abba Ji
 Saba Hameed as Razia; Salman's mother
 Meekal Zulfiqar as Rony
 Adnan Jaffar as Kifayat; Sara's father
 Naeema Garaj as Kausar, Shehnaz's mother
 Zara Tareen as Feroza; Sara's mother
 Ghazala Javed
 Atif Rathore
 Ahmed Zeb
 Muhammad Hanif
 Fauzia Mushtaq
 Rubab Khan
 Saeed
 Christiana

Nomination
 14th Lux Style Awards - Best Television Actor - Azfar Rehman (Nominated)

References

Pakistani drama television series
2015 Pakistani television series debuts
2015 Pakistani television series endings
Urdu-language television shows
TVOne Pakistan